Rivière-Beaudette is a municipality of Quebec, Canada, located in the southwest corner of the Vaudreuil-Soulanges Regional County Municipality on the border with Ontario along the St. Lawrence River. The population as of the 2021 Canadian census was 2,489.

The area is primarily made up of farmland with residential development along the St. Lawrence River.

History
This location was first identified as "Pointe au Baudet" as early as 1686 on a map by Deshayes. This name, also spelled "Beaudet" and "Baudette" over time, refers to a small peninsula in St. Lawrence River, and was also given to the stream that empties into the St. Lawrence next to it. Various theories exist as to why this location was called baudet, since this name could refer to a donkey, a type of folding bed with canvas straps, or a trestle for cutting wood.

In 1734, Pointe au Baudet was included in the seigneury granted to Paul-Joseph Le Moyne de Longueuil. By 1787, a sawmill existed at the "Baudet" River. In 1855, the Grand Trunk Railway was constructed through the area, and two years later, the "" post office opened.
 
In 1887, the Village Municipality of Rivière Beaudette was formed out of territory ceded by Saint-Zotique.

In 1916, the Parish Municipality of Sainte Claire d'Assise was created, also out of territory ceded by Saint-Zotique. On April 1, 1978, it was renamed to the Parish Municipality of Rivière-Beaudette.

On January 17, 1990, the parish and village merged to form the Municipality of Rivière-Beaudette.

Demographics

Language

Local government

Rivière-Beaudette forms part of the federal electoral district of Salaberry—Suroît and has been represented by Claude DeBellefeuille of the Bloc Québécois since 2019. Provincially, Rivière-Beaudette is part of the Soulanges electoral district and is represented by Marilyne Picard of the Coalition Avenir Québec since 2018.

List of former mayors (since formation of current municipality):
 Richard Leroux (1990–2006)
 Denis Brodeur (2006–2009)
 Patrick Bousez (2009–present)

Education
Commission Scolaire des Trois-Lacs operates Francophone schools.

Lester B. Pearson School Board operates Anglophone schools.
 Soulanges Elementary School in Saint-Télesphore or Evergreen Elementary and Forest Hill Elementary (Junior Campus and Senior campus) in Saint-Lazare

See also
 List of municipalities in Quebec

References

External links

Municipalities in Quebec
Incorporated places in Vaudreuil-Soulanges Regional County Municipality
Quebec populated places on the Saint Lawrence River
Designated places in Quebec